Aventura (foaled 7 March 2008) is a Japanese Thoroughbred racehorse and broodmare. As a juvenile in 2010 she showed very promising form, winning on her debut before running second in the Sapporo Nisai Stakes and fourth in the Hanshin Juvenile Fillies. She missed the first half of the next season but then won the Isaribi Stakes and the Queen Stakes before recording her biggest victory in the Shuka Sho. She sustained her only defeat of the year on her final start when she was beaten a neck by Snow Fairy in the Queen Elizabeth II Commemorative Cup. Her achievements saw her being awarded the 2011 JRA Award for Best Three-Year-Old Filly.

Background
Aventura is a bay mare with a large white star bred in Hokkaido by Northern Farm. During her racing career she carried the green, white and red colours of U Carrot Farm and was trained by Katsuhiko Sumii.

She was from the 6th crop of foals sired by Jungle Pocket who won the Tokyo Yushun and the Japan Cup in 2001. He went on to become a very successful breeding stallion whose other foals included Jaguar Mail (Tenno Sho).

Aventura's dam Admire Sunday showed high class form, winning three race and finishing second in the Hanshin Himba Stakes. As a broodmare she also produced Aventura's full sister Tall Poppy who won the Yushun Himba in 2008. She was a granddaughter of the undefeated French mare Madelia.

Racing career

2010: two-year-old season
Aventura began her racing career in a contest for previously unraced juveniles over 1600 metres at Hanshin Racecourse on 20 June and won from Eishin Osman, a colt who went on to win the New Zealand Trophy. After three-month break she was moved up in class for the Grade 3 Sapporo Nisai Stakes and finished second, three quarters of a length behind the colt All As One. On 12 December at Hanshin, Aventura was one of eighteen contenders for the Grade 1 Hanshin Juvenile Fillies over 1600 metres and started the 8.9/1 third choice in the betting. Ridden by Ryuji Wada she was restrained towards the rear before making steady progress in the straight and finished fourth behind Reve d'Essor, Whale Capture and Rice Terrace, beaten two and a half lengths behind the winner.

In the official Japanese rankings for 2010, Aventura was rated the fourth-best juvenile filly, five pounds behind the top-rated Reve d'Essor.

2011: Three-year-old season

Aventura missed the first half of the 2011 season after sustaining a leg fracture. She made her first appearance of the year on 30 July at Hakodate Racecourse when she won the Isaribi Stakes from the four-year-old Silk Earnest and ten others. Kenichi Ikezoe took the ride two weeks later when the filly was made the 1.7/1 favourite for the Grade 3 Queen Stakes at Sapporo. After racing in fourth or fifth place for most of the way she took the lead in the straight and won by a neck from Cosmo Nemo Shin.

On 16 October, with Yasunari Iwata in the saddle, Avenura started second favourite behind Whale Capture (who had won the Rose Stakes on her last start) in the Grade 1 Shuka Sho over 2000 metres at Kyoto Racecourse. The other sixteen runners included Marcellina (Oka Sho), Meine Isabel (Niigata Nisai Stakes), Erin Court (Yushun Himba) and Calmato (Shion Stakes). After racing in third place behind the front-running outsider Memorial Year, Aventura took the lead in the straight and won by one and a quarter lengths from Kyowa Jeanne with Whale Capture the same distance back in third. Iwata commented:"It is the first time I have ridden her but I didn't feel any concerns".Aventura made her final run of the year in the Queen Elizabeth II Commemorative Cup over 2200 metres at Kyoto on 13 November when she started second favourite behind the British-trained four-year-old Snow Fairy who had won the race in 2010. After racing in mid-division she finished strongly to take second place, a neck behind Snow Fairy, with Apapane, Whale Capture, Reve d'Essor, Erin Court, Dancing Rain and Saint Emilion finishing behind.

In the Japanese rankings for 2011, Aventura was rated best three-year-old filly, four pounds ahead of Whale Capture and Reve d'Essor. In January 2012 Aventura topped the poll for the JRA Award for Best Three-Year-Old Filly, taking 268 of the 285 votes.

Breeding record
Aventura was retired from racing to become a broodmare. As of 2019, she has produced four foals:

Desafiante, a bay filly, foaled in 2015, sired by King Kamehameha
unnamed bay colt, 2016, by Harbinger
Kaiser Line, bay colt, 2017, by Epiphaneia
unnamed bay colt, 2018, by King Kamehameha

Pedigree

Aventura was inbred 4 × 4 to Northern Dancer, meaning that this stallion appears twice in the fourth generation of her pedigree.

References

2008 racehorse births
Racehorses bred in Japan
Racehorses trained in Japan
Thoroughbred family 1-p